Apisamai Srirangsan, nicknamed Birth (born December 15, 1974) was Miss Thailand 1999. She attended the medical school of  Khon Kaen University. She competed in the Miss Universe 1999 pageant competition held in Trinidad and Tobago as the last Miss Thailand titleholder to compete.

Currently, she works as the Director of Bangkok Hospital Rehabilitation and Recovery Center Bangkok Thailand

Filmography

News presenter 
 News presenter Channel 7 (2001-2008)
 Evening News (Part 2) Channel 7
 News Channel 7
 Evening News NBT
 News presenter NBT (2011-2014)
 News presenter One 31 (2014-2015)

Personalities

Work 
On January 14, 2021, during the COVID-19 pandemic in Thailand he was appointed assistant spokesperson for COVID-19 Situation Administration (CCSA) by the CCSA board, led by Prayut Chan-o-cha.

References 

http://www.bangkokhospital.com/index.php?p=doctor_profile&DrID=2282

1974 births
Living people
Apisamai Srirangsan
Miss Universe 1999 contestants
Apisamai Srirangsan
Apisamai Srirangsan
Apisamai Srirangsan
Apisamai Srirangsan
Apisamai Srirangsan